Frank Brown (April 11, 1890 – January 2, 1969) was a Canadian cyclist. He competed in the time trial event at the 1912 Summer Olympics, finishing 5th.

References

External links
 

1890 births
1969 deaths
Canadian male cyclists
Olympic cyclists of Canada
Cyclists from Ontario
Cyclists at the 1912 Summer Olympics
People from Hastings County